"Bop" is a song written by Paul Davis and Jennifer Kimball and recorded by American country music artist Dan Seals. It was released in October 1985 as the second single from his fifth studio album, Won't Be Blue Anymore. It reached number one on the US Billboard Hot Country Singles chart in early 1986, becoming his second number-one hit on that chart and his first as a solo artist. It was a major crossover hit as well, peaking at number 42 on the Billboard Hot 100 and at number 10 on the Adult Contemporary chart. In Canada, it topped the RPM Top Singles and Country Singles charts.

Music video
The music video was directed by George Bloom. It shows an older couple preparing to travel to an armory. It concurrently shows flashbacks of the couple 30 years earlier. One of the highlights in the video is the 30-year flashback of the couple in a 1955 Ford Thunderbird that transforms 30 years later into the 1985 Ford Thunderbird. Towards the end of the video, it shows the couple in their elderly stages dancing at the armory along with many others with Seals performing the song onstage.

The video has not been included in Seals' 1991 video compilation, A Portrait, which also included the video for "They Rage On," plus three other videos for Seals' "God Must Be a Cowboy," "Everything That Glitters (Is Not Gold)" and "Big Wheels in the Moonlight" that were filmed especially for the compilation.

Personnel 
 Dan Seals – lead and backing vocals
 Shane Keister – synthesizers
 Paul Davis – Synclavier, drum programming
 Joe Stanley – guitar
 Steve Gibson – guitar
 Kyle Lehning – drum programming
 Jim Horn – saxophone
 The Cherry Sisters – backing vocals

Charts

Weekly charts

Year-end charts

Certifications

References

1985 singles
1985 songs
Dan Seals songs
EMI America Records singles
RPM Top Singles number-one singles
Song recordings produced by Kyle Lehning
Songs written by Jennifer Kimball
Songs written by Paul Davis (singer)